The Chaperone may refer to:

 The Chaperone (2011 film)
 The Chaperone (2018 film)
 "The Chaperone" (Seinfeld)
 "The Chaperone" (SpongeBob SquarePants)
 "The Chaperone" (The Monkees)

See also
 The Chaperones, a doo wop group
 Chaperone (disambiguation)